Jackass Mail is a 1942 Western comedy film directed by Norman Z. McLeod and starring Wallace Beery and Marjorie Main.

Cast

Reception
According to MGM records the film earned $1,013,000 in the US and Canada and $292,000 elsewhere, making the studio a profit of $230,000.

See also
The other six Wallace Beery and Marjorie Main films:
 Wyoming (1940)
 Barnacle Bill (1941)
 The Bugle Sounds (1942)
 Rationing (1944)
 Bad Bascomb (1946)
 Big Jack (1949)

References

External links
 

1942 films
American black-and-white films
1940s English-language films
Films directed by Norman Z. McLeod
Metro-Goldwyn-Mayer films
1942 Western (genre) films
American Western (genre) films
1940s American films